Linsey-woolsey (less often, woolsey-linsey or in Scots) is a coarse twill or plain-woven fabric woven with a linen warp and a woollen weft. Similar fabrics woven with a cotton warp and woollen weft in Colonial America were also called linsey-woolsey or wincey. The name derives from a combination of lin (an archaic word for flax, whence "linen") and wool.

History
Mentions of a linsey-woolsey appear in late medieval sources in the Netherlands, as well as in other north-western European areas in the proceeding couple hundred years. In French, it went by "tiretaine", Danish "thirumtej", and by other names in other languages. These names were anglicised as "turtein" or "tartan" (not to be confused with tartan patterns). Hemp would also have been used together with the linen in warp yarns at this time.

The coarse fabric called stuff woven at Kidderminster from the 17th century, originally a wool fabric, may have been of linsey-woolsey construction later on.
Linsey-woolsey was an important fabric in the Colonial America due to the relative scarcity of wool in the colonies. Many sources say it was used for whole-cloth quilts, and when parts of the quilt wore out the remains would be cut up and pieced into patchwork quilts. Some sources dispute this and say that the material was too rough and would have been used instead for clothing and occasionally for light blankets. It was also used as a ground fabric for needlepoint.

Linsey-woolsey was valued for its warmth, durability, and cheapness, but not for its looks.

Linsey-woolsey is also sometimes used to refer to 18th century woven coverlets or bed coverings made with a linen warp and woollen weft.  The term is sometimes incorrectly applied to glazed textiles.

Linsey-woolsey continues to be woven today in small quantities for historical recreation and Colonial period decorating uses.

Cultural references
Mark Twain in his 1884 novel, The Adventures of Huckleberry Finn "The women had on sun-bonnets; and some had linsey-woolsey frocks,"
Lucy Maud Montgomery uses the term "wincey" six times in Anne of Green Gables: "a very ugly dress of yellowish gray wincey".
Compton Mackenzie creates a minor character called Colonel Lindsay-Woolsey in his 1941 comedy novel The Monarch of the Glen.
In Patrick Dennis's 1955 comic novel Auntie Mame Lindsay Woolsey is Mame Dennis's publisher friend.
In the 1976 film The Outlaw Josey Wales, Josey's injured sidekick, Jamie (Sam Bottoms), refers to his father's embarrassing ability to sew ornate designs on his otherwise drab linsey-woolsey shirt.
Washington Irving in his 1820 short story, The Legend of Sleepy Hollow, "a quantity of linsey-woolsey just from the loom."
Harriet Jacobs in her autobiography Incidents in the Life of a Slave Girl, mentions "I have a vivid recollection of the linsey-woolsey dress given to me every winter by Mrs. Flint.  How I hated it!  It was one of the badges of slavery."
Elihu Burritt in Walks in the Black Country and its Green Border-Land: "Here I saw the greatest contrast that I ever witnessed in England—Nature in linsey-woolsey petticoat and Nature in her court-dress"
In John O'Hara's novel OURSELVES TO KNOW (London: The Cresset Press, 1960), it reads: "The man in the linsey-woolsey cassock got to his feet and blessed the hour" (p. 323).

See also
 Stuff (cloth)
 Calamanco
 Linen
 Weaving
 Woollen
 Shatnez

Notes

Further reading
Tozer, Jane and Sarah Levitt, ''Fabric of Society: A Century of People and their Clothes 1770-1870, Laura Ashley Press,

External links 

Quilt.com's history record for linsey-woolsey

Woven fabrics